"Cuz I Love You" is a song by American singer and rapper Lizzo. It was originally released on February 14, 2019 as the first promotional single from her third studio album of the same name. It was serviced to top 40 radio stations on January 28, 2020 as the third single from the album. Lizzo performed the song as the opening number of the 62nd Annual Grammy Awards on January 26, 2020.

Composition
"Cuz I Love You" was written by Lizzo alongside American rock band X Ambassadors, the latter of whom provided production for the track. Musically, "Cuz I Love You" is a big band-inspired soul song that showcases Lizzo's vocal ability. Lizzo's performance in the song has been compared to that of Darlene Love. The number begins with the singer loudly belting "I’m crying/Cuz I love you" before being accompanied by a brass and percussion-heavy band. The song's lyrical content discusses the singer entering a relationship with someone special and departing from her previous approaches to romance. The song title, as well as some of the lyrics, are obviously inspired by Slade's 1971 single "Coz I Luv You".

Critical reception
Alex Young of Consequence of Sound deemed the song "a soulful big band offering in the vein [of] Darlene Love that showcases Lizzo's immense vocal prowess". Bailey Calfee, writing for Nylon, wrote that the track "lets Lizzo flex her unbeatable vocal range, and we hear her belting to the gods. In the song, she gives an emotional confession of love to an unknown suitor, who has seemingly made her realize what true love really feels like." Katherine Gillespie of Paper called the song "a big band soul moment that fully harnesses her impressive vocal powers." Brittany Spanos of Rolling Stone wrote that the song "offers a fiery taste of her incredibly vocal and genre range".

Music video
The music video for "Cuz I Love You" was directed by Quinn Wilson. The black-and-white visual for the album sees the singer adopt the role of a priest, and give a church session for several worshipping men.

Charts

Certifications

Release history

References

2019 songs
2020 singles
Atlantic Records singles
Lizzo songs
Songs written by Lizzo
Soul ballads